The 1982 NCAA Division I men's basketball tournament involved 48 schools playing in single-elimination play to determine the national champion of men's NCAA Division I college basketball. It began on March 11, 1982, and ended with the championship game on March 29 in the Louisiana Superdome in New Orleans, Louisiana. A total of 47 games were played.

North Carolina, coached by Dean Smith, won the national title with a 63–62 victory in the final game over Georgetown, coached by John Thompson. James Worthy of North Carolina was named the Tournament's Most Outstanding Player.

This tournament was the first to eliminate the national third-place game, which had been held every year since the 1946 tournament. It was also the first tournament to be televised by CBS after it acquired the broadcasting rights from NBC. Gary Bender and Billy Packer (also from NBC Sports) called the Final Four and National Championship games. In addition, it was the first tournament to include the word "Men's" in its official title, as the NCAA began sponsoring national championships in women's sports (including basketball) in the 1981–82 school year.

This was the last NCAA tournament to grant automatic bids to the winners of ECAC regional tournaments for Northeastern Division I independents organized by the Eastern College Athletic Conference, a loose sports federation of Northeastern colleges and universities. The practice had begun with the 1975 tournament to ensure that Northeastern independents would not be excluded, but was discontinued when all remaining Northeastern independents formed new conferences or joined existing ones after this season.

For the first time since 1966, the tournament field did not include UCLA.

Championship game

The 1982 NCAA Division I Men's Championship Game was between the Georgetown Hoyas and the North Carolina Tar Heels. Both teams had Hall of Fame coaches, Dean Smith for the Tar Heels and John Thompson for the Hoyas. As for players, five future NBA All-Stars were included between the two sides—the Hoyas featured center Patrick Ewing and Eric "Sleepy" Floyd, while the Tar Heels answered with forward James Worthy, forward and center Sam Perkins, and young guard Michael Jordan. This also marked the only NCAA championship game to feature three of the NBA 50 Greatest Players (Jordan, Ewing and Worthy) chosen in 1996 on the occasion of the NBA's 50th anniversary.
 
The championship matchup was tightly contested throughout, with no team ever leading by more than a few points, and 15 lead changes in the game overall. With slightly over a minute to go, Floyd scored to put Georgetown on top, 62–61. During the ensuing timeout, Smith predicted that Georgetown would heavily guard Worthy and Perkins and drew up a play that would work the ball around to Jordan and then met Jordan's eyes and told him to not be afraid to shoot if he was open. When the ball was worked around, Jimmy Black found Jordan on the left wing, and he rose and hit a jumper with 17 seconds to go to put Carolina back on top, 63–62. Georgetown did not call timeout but immediately pushed the ball up the court. However, guard Fred Brown mistook Carolina's James Worthy for a teammate and passed the ball right to his opponent. Worthy was fouled by Eric Smith with two seconds to go. He missed both free throws, but with no timeouts left (Georgetown coach John Thompson, in a questionable move, used his last one before Worthy's free throws rather than save it to set up a final play) the Hoyas' last desperation shot fell short. On the other hand, Dean Smith's decision to draw up a play for Jordan, rather than Worthy or Perkins, is often regarded as a brilliant coaching move.

Aside from the dramatic finish in the final minute, the 1982 NCAA championship game is today primarily remembered as being the stage on which several eventual basketball legends were introduced to a national audience, particularly North Carolina's Jordan and Georgetown's Ewing, both 19-year-old freshmen at the time of this game. Both had outstanding games - Jordan with 16 points including the game-winner, and Ewing with 23 points and 10 rebounds (but also a few goaltends on blocks that John Thompson supported for intimidation purposes). Jordan and Ewing would go on to have more memorable clashes in the National Basketball Association with the Chicago Bulls and New York Knicks respectively, and both would be inducted into the Hall of Fame. For Jordan's part, his game-winner is often seen as the launching point of his career - the moment that gave him the confidence to become the single greatest basketball player of all time, in no small part due to his clutch performance. Jordan has said multiple times that before he would take game-winning shots with the Bulls, he would sometimes think back to his shot in the 1982 game that propelled North Carolina past Georgetown.

The real star of the 1982 title game, and a third player in this game who would eventually be inducted to the pro basketball Hall of Fame, was Carolina's James Worthy. Worthy scored a game-high 28 points, showing the blazing speed and some of the same authoritative drives to the basket that later became familiar sights during his career with the powerful Los Angeles Lakers of the 1980s. Beyond these three legendary players, two other outstanding pro players of the 1980s and early 90s appeared in this 1982 game: Georgetown's Sleepy Floyd, who went on to an All-Star career in the NBA (including a still-standing record for most points in a quarter and in a half for a playoff game) and Carolina's Sam Perkins, who distinguished himself over a durable NBA career lasting 17 seasons.

Schedule and venues

The following are the sites that were selected to host each round of the 1982 tournament:

First and Second Rounds
March 11 and 13
East Region
 Charlotte Coliseum, Charlotte, North Carolina
Mideast Region
 Memorial Gymnasium, Nashville, Tennessee
Midwest Region
 Mabee Center, Tulsa, Oklahoma
West Region
 Dee Glen Smith Spectrum, Logan, Utah
March 12 and 14
East Region
 Nassau Veterans Memorial Coliseum, Uniondale, New York
Mideast Region
 Market Square Arena, Indianapolis, Indiana
Midwest Region
 Reunion Arena, Dallas, Texas
West Region
 Beasley Coliseum, Pullman, Washington

Regional semifinals and finals (Sweet Sixteen and Elite Eight)
March 18 and 20
Mideast Regional, BJCC Coliseum, Birmingham, Alabama
West Regional, Marriott Center, Provo, Utah
March 19 and 21
East Regional, Reynolds Coliseum, Raleigh, North Carolina
Midwest Regional, The Checkerdome, St. Louis, Missouri

National semifinals and championship (Final Four and championship)
March 27 and 29
Louisiana Superdome, New Orleans, Louisiana

The 1982 Tournament marked the first of five to end at the Superdome, the second domed stadium after the Astrodome and twentieth venue overall to host a Final Four. The tournament was the first to feature Birmingham and Uniondale, as well as the first for Reunion Arena after four previous appearances for SMU's Moody Coliseum in Dallas. The games played at Uniondale were the first in the New York Metropolitan Area since 1974.

Teams

Bracket
* – Denotes overtime period

East region

Midwest region

Mideast region

West region

Final Four

Announcers
Gary Bender and Billy Packer – First round at Logan, Utah (Wyoming–USC); Second Round at Logan, Utah (Georgetown–Wyoming, Fresno State–West Virginia); Second Round at Indianapolis, Indiana (Virginia–Tennessee, Minnesota–Chattanooga); East Regional semifinal (North Carolina–Alabama) at Raleigh, North Carolina; East Regional Final at Raleigh, North Carolina; Mideast Regional Final at Birmingham, Alabama; Final Four at New Orleans, Louisiana
Frank Glieber and Steve Grote – Second Round at Nashville, Tennessee (Louisville–Middle Tennessee State, UAB–Indiana); Second Round at Dallas, Texas (DePaul–Boston College, Arkansas–Kansas State); West Regional semifinal (Georgetown–Fresno State) at Provo, Utah; Midwest Regional Final at St. Louis, Missouri; West Regional Final at Provo, Utah
Jim Thacker and Bill Raftery – East Regional semifinal (Villanova–Memphis State) at Raleigh, North Carolina
Tom Hammond and Larry Conley – Mideast Regional semifinals at Birmingham, Alabama
Fred White and Gary Thompson – Midwest Regional semifinals at St. Louis, Missouri
Larry Zimmer and Irv Brown – West Regional semifinal (Oregon State–Idaho) at Provo, Utah
Jim Thacker and Bill Foster – First round at Charlotte, North Carolina (Ohio State–James Madison, Wake Forest–Old Dominion); Second Round at Charlotte, North Carolina (North Carolina–James Madison, Memphis State–Wake Forest); Second Round at Uniondale, New York (Villanova–Northeastern, Alabama–St. John's)
Verne Lundquist and Dale Brown – Second Round at Tulsa, Oklahoma (Tulsa–Houston, Missouri–Marquette)
Irv Brown and George Raveling – Second Round at Pullman, Washington (Idaho–Iowa, Oregon State–Pepperdine)
Tim Ryan and Irv Brown – First round at Pullman, Washington (Iowa–Northeast Louisiana)

See also
 1982 NCAA Division II men's basketball tournament
 1982 NCAA Division III men's basketball tournament
 1982 NCAA Division I women's basketball tournament
 1982 NCAA Division II women's basketball tournament
 1982 NCAA Division III women's basketball tournament
 1982 National Invitation Tournament
 1982 National Women's Invitation Tournament
 1982 NAIA Division I men's basketball tournament
 1982 NAIA Division I women's basketball tournament

References

NCAA Division I men's basketball tournament
Ncaa
Basketball competitions in New Orleans
Basketball
Basketball in the Dallas–Fort Worth metroplex
NCAA Division I men's basketball tournament
NCAA Division I men's basketball tournament